Margaret Katona Josephs (born April 9, 1967) is an American fashion designer, entrepreneur and television personality. She is the owner, founder and designer of a lifestyle brand called Macbeth Collection. She has been a main cast member of the Bravo reality television series The Real Housewives of New Jersey since its eighth season in 2017.

Early life and education
Josephs was born in Elizabeth, New Jersey to Hungarian immigrants and raised in Westchester, New York. She graduated from FIT with a degree in fashion design. Afterwards, she worked in New York's Garment Center as a dress designer. While working here, she was inspired by the prints and fabrics she worked with which later influenced her own line. After the birth of her son, she decided to establish her own line of decoupage home accessories.

Career
Josephs launched Macbeth Collection in 1999 after realizing the popularity of her decoupage metal buckets and accessories. It has successfully transitioned into a lifestyle brand including tech, clothing and fashion accessories.

According to Women's Wear Daily, Joseph's brand, the MacBeth Collection was sued for copyright infringement by popular brand Vineyard Vines.

In August 2017, it was announced Josephs had joined the cast of The Real Housewives of New Jersey for the series eighth season, which premiered on October 4, 2017.

Personal life
Josephs currently resides in Englewood, New Jersey. She formerly resided in nearby Tenafly, and her former home has been featured in many publications, such as 201 Magazine. Margaret Josephs married her first husband Jan Josephs in New York City. They had one son together and Jan Josephs had three children from a previous marriage. She is now married to her second husband, Joe Benigno.

Awards and honors
Country Living Entrepreneur of the Year, 2007
Honorary Judge on the panel of Country Living Entrepreneur of the Year, 2008

References

External links 
 Macbeth Collection
 Margaret Josephs speaking about Entrepreneurship at Tenafly Career Fair, 2010

Living people
1967 births
People from Englewood, New Jersey
People from Tenafly, New Jersey
American people of Hungarian descent
American fashion designers
American fashion businesspeople
Fashion Institute of Technology alumni
American women company founders
American company founders
Fashion stylists
American socialites
The Real Housewives cast members
American women fashion designers
21st-century American women